The Holden Special Vehicles GTS (or simply HSV GTS) is a performance vehicle produced by Australian company Holden Special Vehicles (HSV), the performance division of Holden. The GTS was introduced in 1992 along with the VP Series ClubSport as a flagship model for the HSV brand, featuring more luxury fittings, along with higher output engines and stronger running gear. From 1994 until 1997, the GTS featured a 5.7L stroker version of the 5000i Holden V8, before being replaced by the Chevrolet Gen III small block V8. In 1998 the HSV GTSR was released, as a limited production run featuring a worked engine, custom interior and unique XU3 Yellah paintwork. These cars have since sold for upwards of $1,000,000 (AUD), in 2017, HSV announced the HSV GTSR W1, 275 examples (250 for Australia, 25 for New Zealand) were slated for production in 2018, after the closure of Holden's Elizabeth plant, its last Australian manufacturing plant. The W1 featured a 6.2 Liter, Supercharged 'LS9' V8 out of a C6 Corvette ZR1, Custom made carbon fibre parts, fully custom interior, and much more. Additionally, 4 examples of the HSV GTSR W1 Maloos were produced, initially not supposed to be produced, however, four tempting Maloo ute bodies sitting aside got to a few workers who then pitched it to management, they allowed it since the whole point of the W1 was for the company to go out in style, these cars are now four of the most valuable road cars ever produced in Australia, being as rare as a complete Ford Falcon XA GTHO Phase IV, which also ended production after 4 vehicles (although one was written off in the 70s).

References 
 

GTS
Cars introduced in 1992